Panipak "Tennis" Wongpattanakit (born 8 August 1997) is a Thai taekwondo athlete. She is currently the top-ranked athlete in the women's 49kg.

Career 
Panipak became a world champion at the 2015 World Taekwondo Championships, claiming a gold medal in the 46 kg event which was her first world title. She claimed a bronze medal at the 2016 Summer Olympics in the –49 kg class during her first Olympic appearance for Thailand. She nearly quit taekwondo out of frustration after the Olympics and took a brief break from the sport for about two months.

She claimed a bronze medal in the women's flyweight event at the 2017 World Taekwondo Championships. She claimed her first Asian Games gold medal during the 2018 Asian Games in women's 49kg event. She won the gold medal in the women's flyweight event during the 2019 World Taekwondo Championships. She was awarded the Female Athlete of the Year by the World Taekwondo during the 2019 World Taekwondo Gala Awards.

She also represented Thailand at the 2020 Summer Olympics and claimed a gold medal in the women's 49kg event. This win also became the first Olympic gold medal win for Thailand in taekwondo. Panipak was also awarded Thailand's first and only gold medal at the 2020 Summer Olympics.

Royal decorations 
 2020 –  Companion (Third Class) of The Most Admirable Order of the Direkgunabhorn
 2017 –  Companion (Fourth Class) of The Most Admirable Order of the Direkgunabhorn
 2014 –  Companion (Fifth Class) of The Most Admirable Order of the Direkgunabhorn

See also
List of Youth Olympic Games gold medalists who won Olympic gold medals

References

External links

1997 births
Living people
Panipak Wongpattanakit
Panipak Wongpattanakit
Asian Games medalists in taekwondo
Taekwondo practitioners at the 2014 Asian Games
Medalists at the 2014 Asian Games
Medalists at the 2018 Asian Games
Panipak Wongpattanakit
Panipak Wongpattanakit
Taekwondo practitioners at the 2014 Summer Youth Olympics
Taekwondo practitioners at the 2016 Summer Olympics
Taekwondo practitioners at the 2020 Summer Olympics
Medalists at the 2016 Summer Olympics
Medalists at the 2020 Summer Olympics
Panipak Wongpattanakit
Panipak Wongpattanakit
Panipak Wongpattanakit
Olympic medalists in taekwondo
Universiade medalists in taekwondo
Panipak Wongpattanakit
Panipak Wongpattanakit
Southeast Asian Games medalists in taekwondo
Taekwondo practitioners at the 2018 Asian Games
Competitors at the 2013 Southeast Asian Games
Competitors at the 2017 Southeast Asian Games
Panipak Wongpattanakit
World Taekwondo Championships medalists
Competitors at the 2019 Southeast Asian Games
Medalists at the 2017 Summer Universiade
Medalists at the 2019 Summer Universiade
Panipak Wongpattanakit
Asian Taekwondo Championships medalists
Panipak Wongpattanakit
Competitors at the 2021 Southeast Asian Games
Panipak Wongpattanakit